WCND (940 AM) is a radio station licensed to Shelbyville, Kentucky, United States.  The station is owned by Pedro C. Arce.

The station had been off the air since at least August 2009.  There is no publicly accessible record indicating that the owner of the station filed for authorization to maintain the license while remaining off the air.

On June 1, 2010, WCND returned to the air with a Regional Mexican format branded as "La Explosiva 940".

References

External links

CND
Shelbyville, Kentucky
Regional Mexican radio stations in the United States